The name Lorenzo has been used for four tropical cyclones in the Atlantic Ocean, replacing the name Luis.

 Tropical Storm Lorenzo (2001), did not threaten land.
 Hurricane Lorenzo (2007), struck Veracruz as a Category 1 hurricane.
 Tropical Storm Lorenzo (2013), did not threaten land.
 Hurricane Lorenzo (2019), the easternmost Category 5 hurricane on record.

Lorenzo